Fresvik is a village in the municipality of Vik in Vestland county, Norway. It is located on the southern shore of the Sognefjorden, just west of where the Aurlandsfjorden joins the Sognefjorden. The population (2001) of Fresvik is approximately 275.

Fresvik has been hosting the Fres music festival in July annually since 2005. Fresvik Church is located in the village, serving the eastern part of the municipality.

Economy
Agriculture is one of the main industries around Fresvik Some of the main agricultural products are fruit and berries (mainly strawberries) and there are also some lush mountain pastures for cattle or sheep.  There is also the Fresvik produkt factory which produces refrigeration equipment.

History
Fresvik was an isolated valley community until 1976.  People could only access the village by boat on the Sognefjorden.  In 1976, a road from Feios to Fresvik was completed, marking the first time ever that there was a road connection to the village.  Historically, Fresvik had been a part of Leikanger Municipality since the main part of Leikanger is located directly north (across the fjord).  After the road was completed to Fresvik from Feios and westward into Vik Municipality, discussions began about municipal borders since Fresvik now was more easily connected to Vik rather than a  boat ride across the huge Sognefjorden.  As of 1 January 1992, Fresvik and its surroundings (all of Leikanger that was south of the fjord and west of the Aurlandsfjorden) were transferred to Vik Municipality.

Name
The village (and parish) is named after the old Fresvik farm since the Fresvik Church was built there. The first element is the genitive of the name of the god Freyr and the last element is vík which means "inlet" or "bay". Another, less common theory is that is originates from settlement/farmstead of Frisians. The name has similarties to the Scottish Highland hamlet Freswick and with the town of Vreeswijk in the Netherlands. The name Freswick could mean 'Frisians wic' The place name Vreeswijk stemms from the medieval name Fresionovvic (11th century) meaning settlement of Frisians.

Notable residents
Mensen Ernst—long distance runner
 Alexandra Hauglum (b. 2003) — Fresvik is featured in the 2013 documentary "Twin Sisters" produced and directed by Mona Friis Bertheussen, and later aired on public television in the USA.  This film features Chinese-born adoptee Alexandra Hauglum and her parents, residents of Fresvik, as well as her twin sister Mia Hansen, adopted separately by parents from Sacramento, California in the USA.

See also 

 Freswick, Scotland
 Friezenwijk (Heukelum), the Netherlands
 Vreeswijk, the Netherlands

References

External links
 Fres Festival

Villages in Vestland
Vik